Türkçe Sözlü Hafif Anadolu Müziği is an album by Arto Tunçboyacıyan released in 2003.

Track listing
"Today it is Difficult to be Old"
"Keep the Door Open for the Young Generation"
"Missing My Mother"
"Hi My Body"
"What Kind of Humanity Are We?"
"I Wish My Thoughts Can be Wind"
"I Need a New Manager"
"There is Hope Everyday"

Arto Tunçboyacıyan albums
2004 albums